Stephan Sieger (born 3 December 1979) is a German footballer currently playing for FC Astoria Walldorf.

References

External links
 

1979 births
Living people
German footballers
SV Sandhausen players
TSG 1899 Hoffenheim players
Kickers Offenbach players
Fortuna Düsseldorf players
1. FC Saarbrücken players
2. Bundesliga players
3. Liga players
Association football midfielders
FC Astoria Walldorf players
People from Bruchsal
Sportspeople from Karlsruhe (region)
Footballers from Baden-Württemberg